Nyquist may refer to:

Nyquist (surname)
Nyquist (horse), winner of the 2016 Kentucky Derby
Nyquist (programming language), computer programming language for sound synthesis and music composition

See also
Johnson–Nyquist noise, thermal noise
Nyquist stability criterion, in control theory
Nyquist plot, signal processing and electronic feedback
Nyquist–Shannon sampling theorem, fundamental result in the field of information theory
Nyquist frequency, digital signal processing
Nyquist rate, telecommunication theory
Nyquist ISI criterion, telecommunication theory
6625 Nyquist, a main-belt asteroid
Nyquist filter, a filter used in television systems
Enquist
Nyqvist (disambiguation)